Ajeet Singh Dale (born 3 July 2000) is an English cricketer. He made his first-class debut on 1 August 2020, for Hampshire in the 2020 Bob Willis Trophy. He made his Twenty20 debut on 29 May 2022, for Gloucestershire against the Sri Lanka Cricket Development XI during their tour of England.

References

External links
 

2000 births
Living people
English cricketers
Hampshire cricketers
Gloucestershire cricketers
Sportspeople from Slough